Orchesella alticola is a species of slender springtail in the family Entomobryidae.

Subspecies
These two subspecies belong to the species Orchesella alticola:
 Orchesella alticola alticola Uzel, 1891
 Orchesella alticola strigata Stach, 1960

References

Collembola
Articles created by Qbugbot
Animals described in 1891